Dat's How It Happen to'M is the only studio album by Da Headbussaz, a collaboration between Three 6 Mafia and Fiend. Da Headbussaz is a trio consisting of DJ Paul, Juicy J, and Fiend. Three 6 Mafia member Crunchy Black is featured on "U See We Poe'', as is Hypnotize Minds artist and Mafia affiliate Project Pat. Frayser Boy and La Chat, also Hypnotize Minds artists, are likewise featured on the album, in "Powder Cake". There was a three-song promo released ahead of the album's release, which contained "Where They Hang" (titled "Where Them Niggas Hang" on the promo), "Get the Fuck Out My Face", and "Hands On Ya".

On November 2, 2002, the album peaked at #1 on the US Billboard Independent Albums chart.

Track listing 

 All tracks are produced by DJ Paul and Juicy J except track 10, produced by Fiend.

 "It's Bought To Happen To'M" (Intro) — 0:33
 "Where They Hang" (prod. DJ Paul) — 4:08
 "U See We Poe" (Featuring Project Pat & Crunchy Black) (prod. DJ Paul) — 5:12
 "Head Bussaz" (prod. Juicy J) — 4:29
 "How To Get Rid Of A Dead Body" (Skit) — 1:19
 "Dat's How It Happen To'M" (prod. DJ Paul) — 4:27
 "Powder Cake"  (Featuring Frayser Boy & La Chat) (prod. Juicy J) — 4:26
 "Get The Fuck Out My Face" (prod. DJ Paul) — 5:05 
 "Smoke If U Got It" (prod. DJ Paul) — 5:46
 "Hands On Ya" (prod. Fiend) — 4:50
 "Ruffest Niggaz Out" (prod. DJ Paul and Juicy J) — 4:00
 "Crap Table" (Skit) — 0:32
 "Crown Me" (prod. Juicy J) — 4:48
 "Gone Be Sum Shit" (prod. Juicy J) — 4:18
 "U See We Poe" (Featuring Project Pat & Crunchy Black) (Screwed) (prod. DJ Paul) — 6:02
 "Hypnotize Minds & Fiend Ent." (Outro) — 2:56

Charts

References 

2002 albums
Collaborative albums
Three 6 Mafia albums
Fiend (rapper) albums
Albums produced by DJ Paul
Albums produced by Juicy J